Toussus-le-Noble is a commune in the Yvelines department in the Île-de-France region in north-central France.

History
In 1969, the communes of Châteaufort and Toussus-le-Noble were separated from the Essonne department and added to Yvelines.

See also
Communes of the Yvelines department
Toussus-le-Noble Airport

References

Communes of Yvelines